Puss in Boots: The Last Wish is a 2022 American computer-animated adventure film produced by DreamWorks Animation and distributed by Universal Pictures. The sequel to the spin-off film Puss in Boots (2011) and the sixth installment in the Shrek franchise, the film was directed by Joel Crawford and co-directed by Januel Mercado. Based on the character from Shrek 2 (2004) and inspired by the eponymous fairy tale, the film's screenplay was written by Paul Fisher and Tommy Swerdlow, with a story by Swerdlow and Tom Wheeler (the latter of whom wrote the 2011 film). The voice cast of Puss in Boots: The Last Wish includes Antonio Banderas and Salma Hayek Pinault reprising their respective roles as the titular character and Kitty Softpaws, and are joined by Harvey Guillén, Florence Pugh, Olivia Colman, Ray Winstone, Samson Kayo, John Mulaney, Wagner Moura, Da'Vine Joy Randolph, and Anthony Mendez, who voice new characters introduced in the film. Set after Shrek Forever After (2010), the film follows Puss in Boots as he journeys to find the mystical Last Wish for the Wishing Star by teaming up with Kitty and Perrito (Guillén) to restore the first eight of his nine lives, by wishing on the mystical Last Wishing Star. They must race against Goldilocks and her Three Bears Crime Family (Pugh, Winstone, Colman, and Kayo), and "Big" Jack Horner (Mulaney), who all desire the star; Puss must also avoid a mysterious hooded wolf (Moura), who plots to kill him.

Plans for a sequel to Puss in Boots began in November 2012, when executive producer Guillermo del Toro shared plans to take the titular character on an adventure to a "very exotic locale", who also stated a couple of drafts for the screenplay were completed. Work on a sequel began in April 2014, according to Banderas. The film's title was announced as Puss in Boots 2: Nine Lives & 40 Thieves in June 2014. After being stuck in development hell, the project was revived in November 2018, with Illumination founder and CEO Chris Meledandri confirmed to be an executive producer. It was announced that the film would be helmed by Bob Persichetti, the head of story of the first film and one of the three directors of Sony Pictures Animation's Spider-Man: Into the Spider-Verse (2018), in February 2019. Crawford was later announced as the new director in March 2021, along with Mercado. The majority of the new cast members, along with Pinault's return, were announced in March 2022. The story drew inspiration from Spaghetti Western films, with The Good, the Bad and the Ugly (1966) being cited as a particular influence. As with DreamWorks' previous film The Bad Guys (2022), the film has a stylized animation style, inspired by Spider-Man: Into the Spider-Verse. With new technology, the team was able to give the film a painterly style to resemble a fairy-tale story, rather than utilizing the realistic visual style of every previous installment of the Shrek franchise.

Puss in Boots: The Last Wish premiered at Lincoln Center in New York City on December 13, 2022, and was theatrically released in the United States on December 21, 2022, after being delayed due to restructuring at DreamWorks. The film received positive reviews from critics, praising its animation, themes, voice acting, humor, and portrayal of Death. Many reviewers considered it superior to its predecessor, as well as one of the best films in the Shrek franchise. It was also a commercial success, grossing $470 million worldwide on a production budget of $90 million, becoming the tenth-highest-grossing film of 2022. It was nominated for Best Animated Feature Film (but lost to Guillermo del Toro's Pinocchio) and numerous accolades, including at the Academy Awards, Golden Globes, Critics' Choice Awards, and British Academy Film Awards.

Plot

While hosting a party in the town of Del Mar, legendary hero and outlaw Puss in Boots accidentally awakens a sleeping giant. He subdues the creature but is crushed by a bell. Waking up in a hospital, the town doctor informs him that he has lost eight of his nine lives and suggests Puss should retire. That night in a bar, Puss meets a black-hooded wolf, who disarms and wounds him in a swordfight.

Traumatized, Puss flees to the house of cat lady Mama Luna, where he buries his clothes and meets an optimistic Chihuahua disguised as a cat whom he calls Perrito. Goldilocks and her Three Bears Crime Family soon arrive at Luna's home. They plan to hire Puss to steal a map bearing the Wishing Star's location from amoral pastry chef "Big" Jack Horner, but fail to recognize him and leave after finding his "grave".

Puss decides to use the Star to restore his lost lives. Accompanied by Perrito, he breaks into Horner's bakery to steal the map, but is interrupted by his resentful ex-fiancée Kitty Softpaws, Horner, and Goldi and the bears. Puss manages to escape with the map alongside Kitty and Perrito, though he sees the wolf threaten him while fleeing.

The map leads the trio to the Dark Forest, a pocket dimension that changes its landscape depending on the map's holder. During another clash with Horner, his henchmen, and Goldi and the bears, Puss sees the wolf again and runs off, distracting Kitty and allowing Goldi to obtain the map. After Perrito calms Puss's panic attack, Puss confesses to being on his last life, and his remorse for leaving Kitty on their wedding day. Kitty overhears them and reveals that she never attended the wedding either, believing Puss could not love anyone more than himself.

Puss and Kitty steal back the map while Goldi and the bears are distracted by a manifestation of their woodland cottage. As the dimension shifts, Puss accidentally traps himself in a crystalline cave, where he encounters his arrogant past lives, and the wolf, who reveals himself as Death. Feeling disrespected by Puss not valuing his extra lives, Death wants to take Puss's final life prematurely. Horrified, Puss runs out of the cave towards the Star alone, ignoring Kitty and Perrito's pleas for him to stop. Meanwhile, Goldi reveals to the bears that her wish is to be reunited with her biological family; although they are devastated, the bears agree to help her.

Puss arrives at the Star and begins to make his wish using the map, but is confronted by Kitty, who berates him for his selfishness and confesses that her wish was to find someone she could trust. Goldi, the bears, and Horner arrive, and a fight ensues for the map; Goldi briefly obtains the map, but abandons it to save Baby Bear, while Kitty traps Horner inside his magical bottomless bag. 

Death mounts the Star and challenges Puss. Having learned the value of life from his time with his companions, Puss forgoes wishing for more lives and accepts Death's duel. Puss disarms the wolf, and declares that while he knows he can never defeat Death, he will never stop fighting for his last life. Seeing that Puss has lost his arrogance, Death begrudgingly spares him. Before leaving, Death and Puss agree they will meet again one day. 

Horner eats a magic snack inside the bag, which makes him gigantic and allows him to escape. He attempts to make his wish to control all of the world's magic for himself, but Perrito distracts him long enough for Puss, Kitty, and Goldi to destroy the map, causing the Star to collapse and consume Horner. In the aftermath, Goldi affirms to the bears that they are her true family, and they leave to take over Horner's bakery. Puss rekindles his romance with Kitty; the two and Perrito later steal a ship and set sail to the Kingdom of Far Far Away.

Voice cast

 Antonio Banderas as Puss in Boots, a swashbuckling cat fugitive from the law and a hero of San Ricardo who has lost eight of his nine lives.
 Salma Hayek Pinault as Kitty Softpaws, a street-savvy Tuxedo cat who is Puss' ex-fiancée, and seeks the Wishing Star to find somebody she can trust.
 Harvey Guillén as Perrito, a friendly and naive therapy dog who started out as one of Mama Luna's pet cats, because he disguised himself as a cat.
 Florence Pugh as Goldilocks, the leader of the Three Bears Crime Family who wants to use Last Wish to regain her biological family.
 Kailey Crawford as Young Goldilocks
 Olivia Colman as Mama Bear – Papa Bear's wife, Baby Bear's mother and Goldilocks' adoptive mother.
 Ray Winstone as Papa Bear – Mama Bear's husband, Baby Bear's father and Goldilocks' adoptive father.
 Samson Kayo as Baby Bear – Papa Bear and Mama Bear's son, and Goldilocks' adoptive brother. The character was previously voiced by Bobby Block in Shrek.
 John Mulaney as "Big" Jack Horner, a feared pastry chef and crime lord who plans to use the Wishing Star to gain control of all magic. He collects various magical items, creatures and people ever since he was snubbed of fairy-tale fame by calling himself "Little" Jack Horner as a kid. His group of henchmen cooks is called "the Baker's Dozen".
 Wagner Moura as the Wolf, later revealed to be the physical embodiment of Death. He wields twin sickles that combine into a double-bladed glaive.
 Da'Vine Joy Randolph as Mama Luna, an elderly cat lady who initially takes Puss in.
 Anthony Mendez as the doctor who tells Puss to retire after informing him of his eight deaths.
 Kevin McCann as the Ethical Bug, a parody of Jiminy Cricket.
 Bernardo De Paula as the Governor of del Mar
 Betsy Sodaro and Artemis Pebdani as Jo and Jan Serpent, twin criminal sisters who deliver the map of the Wishing Star to Jack.
 Conrad Vernon as Gingy
 Cody Cameron as Pinocchio

Shrek and Donkey make non-speaking appearances in a brief flashback, as does Imelda from the first Puss in Boots; Also from the previous film, Humpty Alexander Dumpty's first name appears in a book Goldi reads.

Production

Development
In November 2012, executive producer Guillermo del Toro shared director Chris Miller's intentions to take the titular character on an adventure to a "very exotic locale." He also said a couple of drafts for the screenplay were completed. In April 2014, voice actor Antonio Banderas said work on the sequel had begun. On June 12, 2014, the movie was titled Puss in Boots 2: Nine Lives & 40 Thieves. In March 2015, Banderas said the script was under restructuring. He also hinted at the possibility of Shrek appearing in the film.

By November 2018, Illumination founder and CEO Chris Meledandri had been brought on board as an executive producer of both Shrek 5 and Puss in Boots 2. In February 2019, it was reported that Bob Persichetti was set to direct the film while Latifa Ouaou, producer of the first film, would oversee the development of the sequel with Meledandri; Persichetti and Ouaou previously worked on the first film as head of story and producer, respectively. On August 19, 2020, DreamWorks trademarked Puss in Boots: The Last Wish as the new title of the sequel, which was approved in December. In March 2021, Joel Crawford replaced Persichetti as director, having previously helmed DreamWorks' The Croods: A New Age (2020), with producer Mark Swift, editor James Ryan, and screenwriter Paul Fisher returning as collaborators along with Januel Mercado serving as the film's co-director. Along with Salma Hayek (now credited as Salma Hayek Pinault) reprising her voice role, new cast members were announced in March 2022, including Harvey Guillén, Florence Pugh, Olivia Colman, Ray Winstone, Samson Kayo, John Mulaney, Wagner Moura, Da'Vine Joy Randolph, and Anthony Mendez.

Writing 

While wanting the film to retain the adult humor from previous entries, Crawford also wanted the film to have a darker tone, with Puss' mortality and fear of death being the film's main focus, wanting to use the concept of Puss being in his last life to tell a story about how to enjoy life. Swift felt the Shrek franchise being over 20 years old by the time the project entered production allowed the film to explore darker themes than its predecessors. He drew inspiration from fairytales by the Brothers Grimm and how they were "cautionary tales that took you somewhere dark to make you appreciate the light". This also influenced the decision to depict Death as a wolf, as wolves in Brothers Grimm's stories were depicted as "the personification of fear". Other influences for the film include Spaghetti Westerns films, due to how those films managed to balance between different tones. The Good, The Bad, and the Ugly was cited as a particular influence on the film's plot.

Crawford said he wanted the film's comedy to be "edgy" in the vein of Shrek (2001), aiming to honor what audiences loved from previous entries, although still wanting to do something different with the franchise instead of retreading familiar ground. He also was interested in including more characters from the franchise, albeit not at the expense of the film's story. He also felt that "one foot of Puss in Boots is dipped in the Shrek fairy tale world, but another one is in the spaghetti western world", and aiming to balance both aspects influenced certain decisions for the film.

For the film's opening sequence, the producers didn't want to simply re-introduce the character to general audiences, but also to "[introduce] the world to where the character is now" by establishing him as a celebrity, with the writers drawing inspiration from Mick Jagger. Crawford wanted Puss to start the film as a "larger than life"-type of figure who comes to embrace his vulnerability. Swift described the story as being about Puss "[having] to figure out who am I without all the things that people value in me?". The idea of featuring a scene of Puss having a panic attack was conceived after the team deemed Puss expressing his vulnerabIlities verbally as "insincere", whereas a panic attack was seen as a "natural point" for the character that would force Puss to "let down the facade of being a fearless hero". For the scene, Crawford and storyboard artist Taylor Meacham drew from their personal experiences.

Animation and design
As with DreamWorks' previous film The Bad Guys (2022), the film's design was inspired by Sony Pictures Animation's Spider-Man: Into the Spider-Verse (2018), to make the film look more like storybook illustrations, from an idea suggested by production designer Nate Wragg. In February 2019, Spider-Man: Into the Spider-Verse director Bob Persichetti was set to helm Puss in Boots: The Last Wish, before he was replaced by Crawford in March 2021. Using new technology, the team at DreamWorks focused more on a painterly style design, to make the film look like a fairy-tale world, different than what it was in Shrek (2001) from their defunct studio Pacific Data Images.

Music

Heitor Pereira composed the film's score, replacing Henry Jackman from the first film. Additionally, three original songs were made for the film by Karol G, Daniel Oviedo, Heitor Pereira, Paul Fisher, Dan Navarro, and Gaby Moreno. Karol G performs "La Vida es Una", co-written by herself and Daniel Oviedo and released on December 8, 2022 while Heitor Pereira co-wrote two songs titled "Fearless Hero", performed by Antonio Banderas and co-written by Dan Navarro and Paul Fisher, and "Por Que Te Vas", co-written with and performed by Gaby Moreno. The soundtrack was released on December 16, 2022, by Back Lot Music, in addition to cover of the Doors' "This Is the End" performed by Dan Navarro. Music from Shrek 2 was used in the film by Harry Gregson-Williams from the tracks "Obliged to Help" and "The End / Happily Ever After".

Release
Puss in Boots: The Last Wish premiered at Lincoln Center in New York City on December 13, 2022, and was theatrically released on December 21, 2022. It was originally scheduled to be released on November 2, 2018, and later on December 21, 2018, before it was removed from the release schedule altogether in January 2015 due to corporate restructuring and DreamWorks Animation's new policy to release just two films a year. Upon the project's resurrection, it was given a release date of September 23, 2022, in March 2021, but in April 2022, the release date was moved to its current December 21 date, taking over the release of Illumination's The Super Mario Bros. Movie. A one-day public screening occurred on November 26, 2022, in select theaters.

The first thirty minutes of the film were shown at the Annecy International Animation Film Festival on June 14, 2022. Critics noted the darker tone of the movie when compared to its predecessor and director Joel Crawford agreed with them, mentioning that Puss' "fear of death is the engine that drives the movie".

The film also debuted a new animated logo opening for DreamWorks Animation, showcasing characters from The Bad Guys, How to Train Your Dragon, Kung Fu Panda, The Boss Baby, Trolls, and Shrek with a remastered rendition of the 2010 fanfare composed by Harry Gregson-Williams mixed with several notes from the 2019 fanfare composed by John Powell, produced by Suzanne Buirgy from Abominable and Kendall Cronkhite from Trolls served as the production designer.

Home media 
Puss in Boots: The Last Wish was released digitally on January 6, 2023, 16 days after its theatrical release. 

A 4-minute CGI animated short film, Puss in Boots: The Trident, was released as part of the digital release of Puss in Boots: The Last Wish Collector`s Edition on February 21, 2023 and later released on Ultra HD Blu-ray, Blu-ray, and DVD on February 28. The short sees Eric Bauza reprising his role as Puss from The Adventures of Puss in Boots.

As part of their 18-month deal with Netflix, the film will stream on Peacock for the first four months of the pay-TV window, then move to Netflix for the next ten, and then will return to Peacock for the remaining four.

Reception

Box office
, Puss in Boots: The Last Wish has grossed $182.6 million in the United States and Canada, and $287.9 million in other territories, for a worldwide total of $470.7 million, making it the tenth-highest-grossing film of 2022.	

In the United States and Canada, Puss in Boots: The Last Wish was projected to gross $25–30 million from 4,000 theaters over its four-day opening weekend. The film made $3.2 million on its first day and $2.9 million on its second, with The Hollywood Reporter noting that Winter Storm Elliot and the threat of a tripledemic surge in COVID-19 and flu cases could affect the box office in the subsequent days. It went on to debut to $12.4 million in its opening weekend (and an estimated total of $26.2 million over the six days), finishing second behind holdover Avatar: The Way of Water. Despite opening below projections, Universal’s president of domestic distribution Jim Orr and box office analysts believed the film could make up ground in the coming weeks through word-of-mouth and schools being on holiday. In its second weekend, Puss in Boots: The Last Wish grew 35% from its debut weekend, grossing $16.8 million. Its third weekend, the film fell 19% with $13.5 million, which was the first non-holiday weekend in its run. The film made $14.5 million in its fourth weekend and $18.9 million over the four day Martin Luther King Jr. Weekend (Friday–Monday) while also crossing the $100 million mark at the United States and Canadian box office. Puss in Boots: The Last Wish is the tenth highest-grossing film of 2022 in the U.S and Canada.

Critical response
  Audiences polled by CinemaScore gave the film an average grade of "A" on an A+ to F scale, while PostTrak reported 89% of audience members gave it a positive score.

IGNs Rafael Motamayor gave a rating of 9 out of 10 and wrote: "Puss in Boots: The Last Wish mixes stunning animation with a poignant, surprisingly mature story to deliver the Shrek franchise's answer to Logan we didn't know we needed." Christy Lemire of RogerEbert.com wrote that after a "roaring start", the film "sags a bit in the midsection as it becomes clear that we're in for a pretty standard quest." She did, however praise that the film manages to "convey messages of selflessness and teamwork in a way that doesn't feel heavy-handed or cloying", along with the voice performances and visuals. Nate Richards of Collider gave the film an A-, saying: "Nothing in Puss in Boots: The Last Wish feels lazy, it more than justifies the long wait. It is not only one of the best animated films of the year, but it's one of DreamWorks' best, and one that will strike a chord with moviegoers of all ages. It's equal parts exciting and hilarious as well as earnest, it never feels like it is talking down to anyone. With The Bad Guys and now Puss in Boots: The Last Wish, it is more than safe to say that DreamWorks is back and (maybe) better than ever."

Peter Debruge of Variety gave the film a positive review, saying the film was "DWA's best film since the How to Train Your Dragon trilogy." Maxance Vincent of Loud and Clear gave the film four out of five stars, saying: "Puss in Boots: The Last Wish is finally giving me hope that the Shrek franchise may not be dead yet. The film opens with one of the most thrilling action set pieces I've seen in an animated film all year (and probably the most thrilling one, since I won't watch another animated film before the end of the year), impeccably scored by Heitor Perreira as our titular character (Antonio Banderas) sings 'Who is our favorite fearless hero?' as he battles a giant. I was locked into the movie, and there was no going back." Emma Stefansky of IndieWire also gave a positive review, enjoying the fact that the film "has no qualms about testing the expectations of its young audience while delivering a freewheeling tale about appreciating the nine lives we already have." Frank Scheck of The Hollywood Reporter gave the film a mixed review, writing "darker in tone but still extremely funny, the film, like so many of its animated brethren, falters when resorting to the frenetic action sequences seemingly designed for tykes' short attention spans." William Bibbiani of TheWrap also gave a mixed review, summarizing that "there are comic moments that land, and action set pieces that pop, but the overwhelming sensation here is a meditation on the inevitability of death."

Accolades

Notes

References

External links
 
 

2020s adventure comedy films
2020s American animated films
2020s children's adventure films
2020s English-language films
2022 animated films
2022 3D films
2022 comedy films
2022 computer-animated films
2022 fantasy films
2022 films
American action comedy films
American action adventure films
American adventure comedy films
American children's animated adventure films
American children's animated comedy films
American children's animated fantasy films
American coming-of-age films
American computer-animated films
American fantasy action films
American fantasy adventure films
American fantasy comedy films
American heist films
American sequel films
Animated action films
Animated coming-of-age films
Animated films about bears
Animated films about cats
Animated films about dogs
Animated films about orphans
Anime-influenced Western animation
DreamWorks Animation animated films
Fairy tale parody films
Film spin-offs
Films about fear
Films about personifications of death
Films about wish fulfillment
Films based on Puss in Boots
Films directed by Joel Crawford
Films scored by Heitor Pereira
Neo-Western films 
Shrek films
Universal Pictures animated films
Universal Pictures films
Western (genre) animated films